The 2018 Eldora Dirt Derby was a NASCAR Camping World Truck Series race held on July 18, 2018 at Eldora Speedway in Rossburg, Ohio. Contested over 153 laps due to an overtime finish on the  dirt track, it was the 13th race of the 2018 NASCAR Camping World Truck Series season.

Entry list

Race

Stage Results

Stage 1

Stage 2

Final Stage Results

Stage 3

References

Eldora Dirt Derby
Eldora Dirt Derby
NASCAR races at Eldora Speedway
2018 NASCAR Camping World Truck Series